Horst Gieseler (born 29 April 1942) is a German hurdler. He competed in the men's 400 metres hurdles at the 1964 Summer Olympics.

References

1942 births
Living people
Athletes (track and field) at the 1964 Summer Olympics
German male hurdlers
Olympic athletes of the United Team of Germany
Place of birth missing (living people)